Richard Keith Herring (born 12 July 1967) is an English stand-up comedian and writer, whose early work includes the comedy double act Lee and Herring (alongside Stewart Lee). He is described by The British Theatre Guide as "one of the leading hidden masters of modern British comedy".

Towards the end of the double act, Herring also worked as a writer, producing four plays. After Lee and Herring went their separate ways he co-wrote the sitcom Time Gentlemen Please, but quickly returned to performance with concept-driven one-person shows like Talking Cock, Hitler Moustache and Christ on a Bike as well as regular circuit stand-up. Herring has created thirteen of these stand-up shows since 2004, performing them for eleven consecutive years at the Edinburgh Festival Fringe, with annual tours and a final performance recorded for DVD. His 2016–17 show was a 'best of' tour, drawing from these shows.

Herring is recognised as a pioneer of comedy podcasting, initially with broadcaster Andrew Collins on The Collings and Herrin Podcast and subsequently with high-profile comedians and celebrities such as Dawn French, Michael Palin and Stephen Fry on Richard Herring's Leicester Square Theatre Podcast. He has maintained a daily blog called Warming Up without a break since 25 November 2002. His blog is archived by the British Library for purposes of UK documentary heritage.

Early life 
Richard Herring was born in Pocklington, East Riding of Yorkshire, and grew up in Cheddar, Somerset. He is the youngest of three children. He attended The Kings of Wessex School, where his father was the headmaster and maths teacher. This later formed the basis of his 2008 stand-up show, The Headmaster's Son. Herring’s mother was also a teacher. The 2007 ITV comedy drama You Can Choose Your Friends, which he wrote and also starred in, was based on his family. Some of the same characters later featured in the Radio 4 series "Relativity".

Herring was a student at St Catherine's College, Oxford, where he wrote and performed for a comedy troupe known as the Seven Raymonds as well as the Oxford Revue. He attained a 2:1 in History.

Career

Lee and Herring 

Between 1992 and 2000, Richard was half of the stand-up comedy double act with Stewart Lee. Their television work included Fist of Fun and This Morning With Richard Not Judy, and they had been collaborating on stage and radio projects since the 1980s.

Lee and Herring wrote material for Chris Morris and Armando Iannucci's On the Hour in 1991 and the duo contributed to the creation of the character that was to be Alan Partridge. In 1992 and 1993, they wrote and performed Lionel Nimrod's Inexplicable World for Radio 4. For Radio 1, they wrote and performed one series of Fist of Fun in 1993, remaking it for television in 1995 and 1996. They hosted a series on Radio 1 in 1994 and 1995, called Lee and Herring. A final television partnership with Lee, This Morning With Richard Not Judy, ran for 18 episodes over two series was eventually cancelled "as a result of BBC management reshuffles".

Solo work 

Herring has written and performed in thirteen one-person shows, eleven of them consecutively. A Herring show typically starts with a run at the Edinburgh Festival Fringe, continues with an extensive UK tour and ends with a recorded performance for DVD.

For radio, Herring co-wrote and presented the history based sketch show That Was Then, This Is Now. For television he wrote Al Murray's sitcom Time Gentlemen Please. He also contributed to the third series of Little Britain as script editor.

In 2005, he presented a chat show called Heads Up with Richard Herring on the Pokerzone channel, in which he interviewed professional poker players and celebrities about their careers and their love of the game. There were 10 episodes in total.

In February 2007, filming began on Herring's comedy drama You Can Choose Your Friends. As well as writing the script, he also acted alongside Gordon Kennedy, Claire Skinner, Rebecca Front, Sarah-Jane Potts, Robert Daws, Anton Rodgers and Julia McKenzie. The show was broadcast on ITV on 7 June 2007.

In January 2008 he began the Collings and Herrin (sic) podcast with Andrew Collins. They celebrated their two-year anniversary with a live "100th" podcast (it was actually the 105th recording) at the Leicester Square Theatre. On 30 January 2010 the pair began a tenure of sitting in for Adam and Joe on BBC Radio 6 Music on Saturdays mornings, a slot they occupied for more than a year.

Herring's 2008 stand-up set The Headmaster's Son earned four 5-star reviews and several 4-star reviews. The set covers his experience growing up in The Kings of Wessex School in Somerset where his father worked as headmaster and how this may have been the origin of his fondness for telling puerile jokes. The show was seen by critics as a thoughtful look at his upbringing, and his relationship with his father, to whom the show is dedicated.

Herring launched his show, Hitler Moustache in 2009 to see if he "could reclaim the toothbrush moustache for comedy – it was Chaplin's first, then Hitler ruined it." The show discusses broader issues, such as fascism and the British National Party. Herring and some of his contemporaries, including Dave Gorman, were angered when material from his show was misrepresented in a Guardian column by critic Brian Logan.

On 14 October 2010, his Radio 4 series Richard Herring's Objective was first broadcast. Here Herring attempts to reclaim controversial items, starting with the toothbrush moustache and moving onto the hoodie, Flag of England and Dolly the Sheep. An Edinburgh special about the See-you-Jimmy hat was broadcast in August 2011 and a second series was recorded in October 2011 with episodes about the golliwog, the wheelchair, Page 3 and the old school tie.

On 27 December 2010, Herring finished second on Celebrity Mastermind with a final score of 34 points. His specialist subject was Rasputin. He was The Pod Delusion "Comedian of the Year 2010."

In May 2011 it was announced that Fist of Fun would be released on DVD by Go Faster Stripe. The first series was released in December 2011 and the second in November 2012, winning 'Best DVD' at the 2013 Chortle Awards

In August and September 2015, he performed all 11 of his previous one man shows, plus a new one, Happy Now?, at the Leicester Square Theatre over the course of six weekends in a season called "The Twelve Shows of Herring". Happy Now? was taken on a 50-plus date UK tour between October 2015 and June 2016. His 2017 tour show was called Richard Herring — The Best. His 2017 Edinburgh Fringe show is called "Oh Frig, I'm 50!" This was taken on a UK tour in the Spring of 2018.

In 2020, Herring was a contestant on the tenth series of Taskmaster. He was the series' eventual winner. Herring later returned to compete against fellow winners Ed Gamble, Kerry Godliman, Liza Tarbuck and Lou Sanders for the second "Champion of Champions" special, which he also won.

Blogs, podcasts and internet 
On 25 November 2002 Herring started his blog, Warming Up, as a way to overcome writer's block. He has written an entry for every day, and has over 7,000 consecutive entries. His regular readership is estimated to be around 3,000. Some ideas recorded in Warming Up have been used in his live shows. The first year of his blog is collected in two books, Bye Bye Balham and The Box Lady and Other Pesticles.

On 12 October 2009, he recorded the first episode of As It Occurs To Me, a weekly radio-style stand-up and sketch show made for the Internet. It stars him, Emma Kennedy, Dan Tetsell and Christian Reilly and currently stands at 18 episodes and 5 bonus mini-episodes. It was nominated for best internet show at the 2010 Sony Awards, though it failed to place. On 7 February 2011, As It Occurs to Me won the first Chortle Internet award On 20 March 2012 he retained it. In 2017, As It Occurs To Me returned as a six-episode web series.

In 2011 Herring began playing himself at snooker for an audio podcast called "Me1 vs Me2 Snooker". On 28 July 2016 he performed at the Tempting Failure extreme art festival In 2020 he started playing this with 32 personas on Twitch and appeared on Comedians: Home Alone on BBC2 in July with an edited frame of Me1 vs Me2.

In 2013, Herring won the Chortle Award for his Leicester Square Theatre Podcast, which again won the award in 2014. In 2012 he had recorded the first 16 episodes of the long-running Richard Herring's Leicester Square Theatre Podcast with guests including Tim Minchin, Stewart Lee, Adam Buxton, David Mitchell and Armando Iannucci. It was nominated for a Sony Award for Best Comedy alongside a list of BBC produced comedy shows in 2013. The show won the Bronze Award. In May and June 2013 he recorded nine podcasts with guests including Stephen Fry, Russell Brand and Mary Beard. His interview with Stephen Fry, was covered by national and international news media including the BBC and Sky News when Fry revealed a recent suicide attempt. The series continued with Harry Shearer, Eddie Izzard and David Cross.

On 17 November 2013, he recorded the first episode of a six-part internet stand-up, sketch and interview show Richard Herring's Meaning of Life, structured around the philosophical concepts of 'Creation', 'the Paranormal', 'Love', 'Death', 'Good & Evil' and 'the Shape of Things To Come', the episode being broadcast online between February 2014 and early 2015.

In February 2014, the first Richard Herring Show was broadcast on Fubar Radio. Herring presented this with comedian Lou Sanders weekly, before quitting the show together; their final episode was broadcast on 24 May 2014.

On 8 March 2018, in aid of International Women’s Day, Herring raised over £150,000 for domestic abuse charity Refuge by responding to anyone on Twitter who asked when International Men's Day was (it is 19 November). He did the same on 8 March 2019, raising almost £130,000. He repeated the exercise on 8 March 2020 and streamed himself responding to tweets live on Twitch. He raised a further £70,000. In 2020 he wrote a book about his experiences and toxic masculinity called The Problem With Men which was published on 5 November.

In March 2020 Herring started streaming regularly on Twitch as the world went into lockdown. He produced weekly remote episodes of his podcast, Richard Herring's Leicester Square Theatre Podcast, did a live feed of Stone Clearing most weekday mornings and played himself at Snooker (with 32 personas) in the evening. He also did occasional non-director's commentaries for films, as well as a newspaper review with his 128-year-old ventriloquist dummy called Ally and Herring's Twitch of Fun.

Motifs and tropes 

 Misspelling words for comic effect, most commonly by adding a superfluous 's' (as in 'John Majors') or 'g' (as in 'skellington')
 Recurrence of the name Ian for characters, especially as a stand-in name for the imagined director of a company (as in 'Ian Starbucks').
 Suggesting ruinous philistine improvements to classic works, including "extra final scenes" for Thelma and Louise and Titanic or that a well-received film would be better "with a shrek in it".

Body of work

Stand up shows

Television

Plays

Film

Radio

Podcasts/vodcasts

Miscellaneous home media

Books

Other writing 
Warming Up blog (2002–present)
Guardian How To Write (contributor) edited by Philip Oltermann The Guardian   (2009)
The Atheist Guide to Christmas Contributor (Editor Ariane Sherine) The Friday Project  (2009)
Shouting at the Telly (Contributor) (Editor John Grindrod) Faber and Faber   (2009)
Roger's Profanisaurus – Das Krapital Introduction Dennis Publishing  (2010)
Metro newspaper weekly column (2012–2016)
Behind the Sofa: Celebrity Memories of Doctor Who (contributor) edited by Steve Berry Matador (2012)
Dead Funny (Contributor) (Editors Robin Ince and Johnny Mains) Salt Publishing  (2014)
Goodbye Europe: Writers and Artists Say Farewell (contributor) 	W&N 	  	2017
Slaughterhouse 5: 50th Anniversary Edition (contributor) 	Vintage	  	2019
Zippy and Me by Ronnie Le Drew (foreword) 	Unbound   	2019

Awards and recognition

 Chortle Awards Internet Award 2011
 Chortle Awards Internet Award 2012
 Chortle Awards Internet Award 2013
 Radio Academy Awards Best Comedy – Bronze, 2013 (Richard Herring's Leicester Square Theatre Podcast)
 Chortle Awards Internet Award 2014
 Chortle Awards Internet Award 2018
 Chortle Awards Legend of Lockdown 2021

Personal life 
Herring was formerly in a relationship with the actress Julia Sawalha, some years after joking on Fist of Fun that "My ideal woman has the head of Julia Sawalha and the body of Julia Sawalha." He also dated Kelly Marcel and Sally Phillips.

In April 2012, Herring married author and comedian Catie Wilkins. They had their first child, a daughter, in February 2015, followed by a son in October 2017.

Herring has raised money for Scope since 2003, and ran the London Marathon in aid of the charity in 2004 as well as the Royal Parks Foundation Half Marathon in 2011, 2013 and 2014. In January 2011 he was nominated for a Just Giving Life Time Achievement Award for his extensive work in helping to raise money, awareness and support for Scope. In 2012 he was made a Patron of Scope.

In 2010 he was made a patron of Humanists UK (formerly The British Humanist Association) and said: 

In February 2021 he had an orchidectomy to remove a cancerous testicle, undergoing one shot of chemotherapy a month later. In November 2021 he ran the Hertfordshire Half Marathon and raised £30,000 for the hospitals that treated his condition. His book about the experience "Can I Have My Ball Back?" was published in October 2022. In April 2022 it was announced that Herring had become an Ambassador for Movember.

See also 
Richard Herring's interview podcasts

References

External links 

RichardHerring.com

BBC news story about Hitler Moustache

1967 births
Alumni of St Catherine's College, Oxford
British humanists
Comedians from Yorkshire
English male comedians
English podcasters
English radio writers
Living people
Twitch (service) streamers
People educated at The Kings of Wessex School
People from Pocklington
People from Sedgemoor (district)
Poker commentators
20th-century English comedians
21st-century English comedians